Helix goderdziana is a species of large air-breathing land snail, a terrestrial pulmonate gastropod mollusk in the family Helicidae, the typical snail.

This is the largest species in the genus Helix.

Distribution 
This species occurs in the Lesser Caucasus in southwestern Georgia

Biotope 
This snail lives in humid mountain forests.

References

Helix (gastropod)
Gastropods described in 2008